Nadka Karadzhova (Bulgarian: Надка Караджова; 1937 – 2011) was one of Bulgaria's most noted folk singers and the first to become internationally known. She was born in Tri Voditzi in the region of Pazardzhik in 1937 into a family of singers. Her most noted hit was Zablelyalo mi aguntze (A Lambkin has commenced bleating) which in 1979 became a UK hit.
On receiving news of her death Tsetska Tsacheva, the President of the Bulgarian National Assembly, wrote a condolatory address:

References

Bulgarian folk singers
20th-century Bulgarian women singers
1937 births
2011 deaths